Al Ahli SC, also known as Al Ahli Doha  is a Qatari multi-sport club based in Doha. It is most notable for its professional association football section. Their home ground is the Hamad bin Khalifa Stadium. Founded in 1950, it is the oldest sports club in Qatar.

History
Al Ahli was founded under the name Al Najah Sports Club in 1950, rendering it the oldest surviving sports club in Qatar. Al Najah SC was established by the founders of another club, called Sawt al-Arab, which was subsequently disbanded. The most prominent of the founders was Naji Musaad, the first president of the club. The club's first headquarters was located in Barahat Al Jufairi, in a residential house which was rented at a monthly fee of 70 Indian rupees. In 1964, the club was formally founded under resolution no. 2. Their first match abroad was scheduled to take place against Al Muharraq. After travelling to Bahrain by sea, the club was turned down because their squad comprised foreign players. Instead, they played against Al Nusoor, whom they defeated 3–1.

In 1972, Al Najah was merged with another local club under its current name, Al Ahli Sports Club. The first board of directors was formed with eight members, and the club's colors were officially decided as green and white. Early managers after the merger include Mohammed Kheiri, the first manager of Al Ahli Sports Club, Sudanese Abdullah Balash, Lebanese Omar Khatib and Sudanese Hassan Osman. They played a friendly against Pelé-led Santos in 1973 at Doha Sports Stadium. In the 1983/84 season, the club received a new headquarters, equipped with modern training and recreational facilities, as did all of the other sports clubs in Qatar.

In the early nineties, under the presidency of Sheikh Khalid bin Ali Al Thani, the club was relegated to the Qatari 2nd Division for the first time in its history. In an attempt to improve its younger generation of players by providing them with invaluable first team experience, the youth team had been given an opportunity to earn promotion back to the first division. They were unsuccessful, and only were runners up that year.

The club has won one domestic trophy since its formation, the Emir Cup. This competition which was secured four times, with the first triumph coming in the inaugural edition under coach Mohammed Kheiri.

Stadium
Al Ahli play their home matches at Hamad bin Khalifa Stadium which has a capacity of 12,000 seats.

Supporters
The club has one of the most consistently high home attendances in the Qatar Stars League. On 11 April 2014, they set a new league record for final match day attendance with 10,142 fans attending the league match against Al Sailiya.

Crest

Performance in UAFA competitions
 UAFA Club Cup: 2 appearances
2003/04: First round
2007/08: First round

Performance in AFC competitions
 Asian Cup Winners Cup: 2 appearances
1992/93: First Round
1998/99: Second Round

Asian record

1. Al Nejmeh SC withdrew from the tournament.

Players
As of Qatar Stars League:

Out on loan

Managerial history
As of 16 April 2021.

Former managers with unknown dates
 Omar Khatib
 Hassan Osman
 Abdullah Balash

Al Ahli club staff
Last update: 2 June 2017.

Club officials

Board

Club presidents
As of February 2012.

Honours
Emir of Qatar Cup
Winners (4): 1973, 1981, 1987, 1992
Runners-up (5): 1975, 1984, 1985, 1998, 2003
Sheikh Jassem Cup
Runners-up (2): 1999, 2006
Qatari 2nd Division
Winners (1): 2012

References

External links
 

 
Al-Ahli Sports Club
Football clubs in Doha
Association football clubs established in 1950
1950 establishments in Qatar